Birmingham Hodge Hill is a constituency of part of the city of Birmingham represented in the House of Commons since 2004 by Liam Byrne, a member of the Labour Party.

Constituency profile
The constituency covers a diverse area of east Birmingham, including the predominantly Asian inner-city area of Washwood Heath and the mostly white area of Shard End on the city's eastern boundary, as well as Hodge Hill itself. Residents have low incomes and there is roughly a three-way split of social housing, privately rented and privately owned homes, leading to one of highest Indices of Multiple Deprivation in the West Midlands for its central area.

Members of Parliament 
The current Member of Parliament is Liam Byrne of the Labour Party, who was elected in the 2004 by-election. He succeeded Terry Davis, who had held the seat since its creation in the 1983 general election. For the four years from the 1979 general election Davis held the largely predecessor constituency to the area, Birmingham Stechford.

Boundaries 

2010–present: The City of Birmingham wards of Bordesley Green, Hodge Hill, Shard End, and Washwood Heath.

1983–2010: The City of Birmingham wards of Hodge Hill, Shard End, and Washwood Heath.

When the Hodge Hill area committee district of Birmingham was created in 2004 its boundaries were those of the constituency.

History
The constituency was created in 1983, taking much of abolished Birmingham Stechford the remainder of which bolstered Birmingham Yardley (principally Stechford itself).  The predecessor seat was won by the Labour candidate in all but one election since its 1950 creation.

In 2004 the appointment of the sitting Member of Parliament (MP), Terry Davis, as secretary general of the Council of Europe resulted in a fiercely contested by-election. The seat saw a strong result by the Liberal Democrat candidate, who hoped to build on her party's previous by-election gain at Brent East, as well as vote splitting by the similarly aligned-to-Labour, anti-war RESPECT The Unity Coalition candidate. On a low turnout, the incumbent held the seat by a margin of 460 votes over the Liberal Democrats.  The 2015 result made the seat the 9th safest of Labour's 232 seats by percentage of majority.

Elections

Elections in the 2010s

1: The Liberal Democrats suspended Waheed Rafiq from the party, over numerous antisemitic, and other offensive social media posts. It was too late to prevent him standing in the election and his name remained on the ballot paper as a Liberal Democrat. Rafiq polled the lowest percentage for any Liberal Democrat candidate in the 2019 election.

Elections in the 2000s
Note: percentage changes are from the figures at the 2001 general election, not the 2004 by-election.

Elections in the 1990s

Elections in the 1980s

See also 
List of parliamentary constituencies in the West Midlands (county)

Notes

References

External links 
 Birmingham city council constituency page

Parliamentary constituencies in Birmingham, West Midlands
Constituencies of the Parliament of the United Kingdom established in 1983